Anders Bäckman (born 8 October 1985) is a Finnish cyclist. He won the Finnish National Road Race Championships in 2018 and 2022.

Major results
2018
 1st  Road race, National Road Championships

2022
 1st  Road race, National Road Championships

References

1985 births
Living people
Finnish male cyclists